This is the List of active aircraft of the Afghan Air Force, prior to the 2021 Taliban offensive.

Current Inventory

References

Military equipment of Afghanistan
Afghan Air Force aircraft, List of active
Active aircraft of the Afghan Air Force